Khazineh (also Romanized as Khazīneh; also known as Salāmāt and Salāmāt Khazīneh) is a village in Shahid Modarres Rural District, in the Central District of Shushtar County, Khuzestan Province, Iran. At the 2006 census, its population was 576, in 80 families.

References 

Populated places in Shushtar County